Scopula dotina is a moth of the  family Geometridae. It is found on Java.

References

Moths described in 1938
dotina
Moths of Indonesia